Mustangs FC is an Australian comedy drama TV series aimed at young teenagers and starring Emmanuelle Mattana as the lead character. The show is set in suburban Australia, and focuses on Mustangs FC, an all-girls soccer team, and focuses on Mattana's character, Marnie, who lives with her mother, Jen (played by Pia Miranda), her mother's boyfriend, Kev, and Kev's daughter, Lara, as well as Marnie's friends and teammates. Launched on International Day of the Girl in 2017, the show explores the relationship between team members, and the struggle to be taken seriously as an all-girls team. The show is airing in the US on Universal Kids and in the UK on CBBC.

As of January 1, 2020, 39 episodes have been produced and aired in a total of three seasons.

Series overview

Episodes

Season 1 (2017)

Season 2 (2019)

Season 3 (2020)

References

External links 

 

Lists of Australian comedy television series episodes
Lists of Australian drama television series episodes